John Walter Gilbert (25 March 1875 – 4 January 1973) was an Australian rules footballer who played with Carlton in the Victorian Football League (VFL).		

Gilbert was born in Fitzroy with the name John Walter Giblett but used the surname Gilbert for all his adult life.

Notes

External links 

Jack Gilbert's profile at Blueseum
 

1875 births
1973 deaths
Australian rules footballers from Melbourne
Carlton Football Club players
People from Fitzroy, Victoria